Nicholls Rivulet is a rural locality in the local government area (LGA) of Huon Valley in the South-east LGA region of Tasmania. The 2016 census recorded a population of 311 for the state suburb of Nicholls Rivulet.

History 
Nicholls Rivulet was gazetted as a locality in 1956. It is believed to be named for William Nichols, the first European to settle in the Port Cygnet area, circa 1835.

Geography
The waters of Port Cygnet form the southern part of the western boundary. Nicholls Rivulet (the watercourse) flows through the locality from north to south-west.

Road infrastructure 
Route B68 (Channel Highway) runs through from north-west to south-west. From there, Route C626 (Nicholls Rivulet Road) provides access to the rest of the locality.

References

Towns in Tasmania
Localities of Huon Valley Council